Miss Morison's Ghosts is a 1981 British supernatural television drama broadcast by ITV starring Hannah Gordon and Wendy Hiller. It was made by Anglia Television,  produced and written by Ian Curteis and directed by John Bruce.   It is based on a book by two Oxford academics, Charlotte Anne Moberly and Eleanor Jourdain who claimed that in 1901, on a day trip to Versailles, they travelled back in time to the 18th century court of Louis XVI of France, in an event known as the Moberly–Jourdain incident.

External links

https://www.worldcat.org/title/miss-morisons-ghosts/oclc/45503801

1981 British television series debuts
1980s British drama television series
British supernatural television shows
Time travel in television
Films set in 1901
Television series about ghosts